Suzzanne Douglas (April 12, 1957 – July 6, 2021) was an American actress. She was best known for her role as matriarch Geraldine "Jerri" Peterson on The WB sitcom The Parent 'Hood, starring Robert Townsend, which originally ran from 1995 to 1999. Douglas also portrayed Amy Simms in the 1989 dance/drama film Tap alongside Gregory Hines and the legendary Sammy Davis Jr., for which she won an NAACP Image Award for Outstanding Supporting Actress in a Motion Picture.

In addition to Tap, Douglas starred in several other motion pictures, among them How Stella Got Her Groove Back (1998), Jason's Lyric (1994), The Inkwell (1994) as well as the 2003 Disney/ABC version of Sounder with Carl Lumbly. Douglas was also well known for her portrayal as Cissy Houston in the Lifetime TV movie Whitney which aired in 2015. In May 2019, she appeared as the mother of one of the main characters in the Netflix miniseries When They See Us directed by the acclaimed Ava DuVernay and produced by Oprah Winfrey's Harpo Films.

Early life and education
Douglas was born in Chicago, Illinois on April 12, 1957. She was one of four children born to Lois Mae Thompson and Donald Douglas, Sr. Reared by a single mother, Douglas grew up in the Altgeld Gardens Homes public housing complex on the city's far south side. She became interested in the arts as a child, citing 1965's The Sound of Music as her inspiration for acting. Douglas attended Thornton Township High School, graduating in 1975. After high school, she studied at Illinois State University; graduating with a Bachelor of Arts degree. She later earned a Master's degree in music specializing in Jazz Vocals at the prestigious Manhattan School of Music.

Career
Douglas made numerous television guest star appearances on shows  such as Bull, Bones and The Good Wife. She also appeared on The Parkers, The Cosby Show, Law & Order: Criminal Intent, NYPD Blue, and Touched by an Angel. On stage, Douglas performed the role of Jenny Diver in The Threepenny Opera starring Sting and Dr. Bearing in Wit, where she was the first African American to perform the role. Douglas was a two-time NAACP Image Award winner, and also won the Black Oscar, a Reel Award, and the Mary Martin Award. Douglas appeared in the Rel Dowdell film Changing the Game in 2011.

Other
Douglas was a honorary member of Delta Sigma Theta sorority where she served on its national executive board as the Honorary Co-chair of the Arts and Letters Commission for thirteen years. In the community, she was a lifetime member of Girl Scouts of the USA, The National Council of Negro Women, Sigma Alpha Lambda (a national leadership and honors organization), and Jack and Jill of America.

Personal life and death
In February 1989, Douglas married neuro-radiologist Roy Jonathan Cobb, to whom she was still married at the time of her death. Together, Douglas and Cobb had one daughter. 

Douglas died on July 6, 2021, at age 64, at her home in Martha's Vineyard after a two-year battle with pancreatic cancer.

Filmography

Film

Television

Theatre

References

External links

1957 births
2021 deaths
20th-century American actresses
20th-century American singers
20th-century American women singers
21st-century American actresses
21st-century American singers
21st-century American women singers
Actresses from Chicago
African-American actresses
American film actresses
American musical theatre actresses
American television actresses
Deaths from cancer in Massachusetts
Deaths from pancreatic cancer
Delta Sigma Theta members
Illinois State University alumni
People from Martha's Vineyard, Massachusetts
20th-century African-American women singers
21st-century African-American women singers